Gunjan Malhotra is an Indian actress, acting in Indian Hindi films and commercials. She acted in the web series The Aam Aadmi Family, by the "Timeliners".

Career 
Gunjan featured in commercials such as Oreo with Ranbir Kapoor and SYSKA LED lights with Irrfan Khan, portrayed the role of a sister to both the actors in the commercials. She got her Bollywood debut in the movie Tevar, where again she played the role of Arjun Kapoor's sister.

She had her first lead role in the movie Badmashiyaan a romantic comedy film. Recently, she played a small role of Meher Poonawala in the movie Airlift with Akshay Kumar.

Filmography

Films

TV & webseries

References

External links
 
 Gunjan interview

Actresses from Mumbai
Living people
Year of birth missing (living people)
Indian film actresses
Indian television actresses
Actresses in Hindi television
Actresses in Hindi cinema
21st-century Indian actresses